Scorpaena scrofa, the red scorpionfish, bigscale scorpionfish, large-scaled scorpion fish, or rascasse is a venomous marine species of ray-finned fish in the family Scorpaenidae, the scorpionfishes. It is found in the Mediterranean Sea, in the eastern Atlantic Ocean and the western Indian Ocean.

Taxonomy
Scorpaena scrofa was first formally described in 1758 by Carl Linnaeus in the 10th edition of his Systema Naturae in which he gave the type localities as the Mediterranean Sea at Rome and Marseille. The specific name scrofa means "a breeding sow" in Latin, presumed to derive from scrofano and scrofanello, which are Italian names for the black scorpionfish (S. porcus) and this species, similar to the Old English "hogfish", possible an allusion to Renaissance mistranslations of Athenaeus' observation that scorpionfishes fed on algae or weed, that led to the belief that these fishes live and feed on mud.

Description
Scorpaena scrofa is the largest eastern Atlantic scorpion fish. Its colouration ranges from brick red to a light pink, and it has dark-coloured blotches on its body.

It has 12 dorsal spines, 9 dorsal soft rays, three anal spines, and five soft rays. It often has a dark spot on its spinous dorsal spines between the 6th and 11th. It has long supraorbital tentacles.

Distribution
Scorpaena scrofa is found in the Mediterranean Sea. It is also found in the eastern Atlantic Ocean around the British Isles, where it is rare, south to Senegal, the Canary Islands, and Cape Verde. It is also found from Namibia south and east along the coast of South Africa into the western Indian Ocean, its otherwise circum-African distribution is interrupted between Guinea and Namibia where it is apparently replaced by the spotted-fin scorpionfish (S. stephanica). In the Indian Ocean the northern most record is from the Gulf of Aqaba and, given its occurrence elsewhere in the western Indian Ocean, it is thought that this record is unlikely to be the result of anti-Lessepsian migration from the Mediterranean through the Suez Canal.

Habitat
By day, it lives in burrows and caves. At night it comes out to hunt.

Behaviour
Scorpaena scrofa is a sedentary, solitary, and nonmigratory fish. It is predatory, feeding on other fish, as well as crustaceans and molluscs.  This is one of the fish used by the marine leech Pontobdella muricata as a host.

As food
Scorpaena scrofa is a traditional ingredient in Marseille bouillabaisse. It is also widely used in Japanese cuisine.

References

External links
 
 Drawing showing side view
 Image
Embryonic and larval development of largescaled scorpionfish Scorpaena scrofa (Scorpaenidae)

Scorpaena
Fish of the Mediterranean Sea
Fish of Europe
Fauna of the Canary Islands
Fish of West Africa
Fish described in 1758
Taxa named by Carl Linnaeus